Tunes is a genus of assassin bug (family Reduviidae), in the subfamily Harpactorinae, containing a single described species, Tunes saucius.

References

Reduviidae